Leon Jensz (15 June 1915 – 16 May 1992) was a Polish sailor. He competed in the O-Jolle event at the 1936 Summer Olympics.

References

External links
 

1915 births
1992 deaths
Polish male sailors (sport)
Olympic sailors of Poland
Sailors at the 1936 Summer Olympics – O-Jolle
Sportspeople from Khabarovsk